Fritz Pütter (1895–1918) was a German First World War fighter ace credited with 25 confirmed aerial victories, including eight observation balloons. Notably, he began his combat career by the rare feat of downing five observation balloons to become an ace. After scoring ten victories with Jagdstaffel 9, he was transferred to command another fighter squadron, Jagdstaffel 68, to score his remaining triumphs. On 16 July 1918, incendiary ammunition aboard his airplane was set off by extremely hot weather, inflicting lingering mortal wounds on Pütter.

The victory list

The victories of Fritz Pütter are reported in chronological order, which is not necessarily the order or dates the victories were confirmed by headquarters.
Abbreviations were expanded by the editor creating this list.

Footnote

References

Sources

 Guttman, Jon (2005). Balloon-Busting Aces of World War 1. Oxford UK, Osprey Publishing. .

Aerial victories of Pütter, Fritz
Pütter, Fritz